Eslamabad (also Romanized as Eslāmābād) is a village in Ahlamerestaq-e Jonubi Rural District, in the Central District of Mahmudabad County, Mazandaran Province, Iran. At the 2006 census, its population was 744, in 192 families.

References 

Populated places in Mahmudabad County